Segal (formerly Segal Rogercasey prior to 2017) is a benefits and human resources consulting firm headquartered in New York City, with more than 1,000 employees throughout the U.S. and Canada. It is the parent of Segal Marco Advisors and Segal Benz.

History 
The firm was known as Segal Rogerscasey prior to its acquisition of the Marco Consulting Group in 2017.

Services 
Segal is privately held and employee owned, providing employee benefits and human resources related consulting services for multiemployer benefit funds, public sector organizations and the private sector. 

Segal offers services in actuarial consulting, retirement benefits, health and group health benefits, compliance, communications, HR administration and technology, insurance brokerage related to HR and benefit plans (such as fiduciary liability, cyber liability, employment practice liability insurance and fidelity bonds), human capital, executive and employee compensation and rewards, organization effectiveness and workforce planning, talent and performance management, and investment.

References

Privately held companies based in New York City
1939 establishments in New York City
Consulting firms established in 1939
American companies established in 1939
Human resource management consulting firms
Consulting firms of the United States